Beryl Mercer (August 13, 1882 – July 28, 1939) was a Spanish-born American actress of stage and screen who was based in the United States.

Early years
Beryl Mercer was born to British parents in Seville on 13 August 1882. 
Her father was Edward Sheppard Mercer, said to be Spanish despite his name, and her mother was the actress Effie (née Martin).

Career 
She became a child actor, making her debut on 14 August 1886 at the Theatre Royal, Yarmouth, when she was age 4. She returned to the stage when she was ten. In London, she appeared in The Darling of the Gods and the production by Oscar Asche of A Midsummer Night's Dream. In 1906 she appeared as a Kaffir slave in the West End play The Shulamite.
She travelled with this play to the United States, where she received good reviews. That 1906 play marked her Broadway debut.

Mercer was honored by Dowager Queen Alexandra for her work as an entertainer during World War I.

Mercer's film debut came in The Christian. She was best known as a film actress for her motherly roles. She played Lew Ayres' mother in All Quiet on the Western Front (1930) and James Cagney's mother in The Public Enemy (1931). She also regularly appeared as a grandmother or cook or maid in some high-profile films. She appeared in more than 50 films between 1916 and 1939, and her career was at a peak in the 1930s when she regularly appeared in several films per year. Mercer appeared in Cavalcade (1933), Jane Eyre, The Little Minister, and The Richest Girl in the World (all 1934). She was in two versions of Three Live Ghosts (1929 and 1935) and  The Little Princess (1939) as Queen Victoria.

Personal life
Mercer was married to Maitland Paisley early in her life. Her only other marriage was to actor Holmes Herbert in the late 1920s. She had one child, Joan Mercer, later Bitting, born on 16 September 1917.

Death
On 28 July 1939, Mercer died in Santa Monica, California, aged 56, following surgery for an undisclosed ailment. She was buried in Forest Lawn Memorial Park in Glendale, California.

Filmography

The Shulamite (1915)
The Final Curtain (1916) - Mary
Broken Chains (1922) - Mrs. Mulcahy
The Christian (1923) - Liza
 We Americans (1928) - Mrs. Levine
Mother's Boy (1929) - Mrs.O'Day
Three Live Ghosts (1929) - Mrs. Gubbins
Seven Days' Leave (1930) - Sarah Ann Dowey
All Quiet on the Western Front (1930) - Paul's Mother
Dumbbells in Ermine (1930) - Grandma Corey
In Gay Madrid (1930) - Doña Concha
Common Clay (1930) - Mrs. Neal
The Matrimonial Bed (1930) - Corinne
An Intimate Dinner in Celebration of Warner Bros. Silver Jubilee (1930, Short) - Mrs. Warner Bros. Pictures
Outward Bound (1930) - Mrs. Midget
Inspiration (1931) - Marthe, Yvonne's Maid
East Lynne (1931) - Joyce
The Public Enemy (1931) - Ma Powers
The Sky Spider (1931) - Mother Morgan
The Man in Possession (1931) - Mrs. Dabney
The Miracle Woman (1931) - Mrs. Higgins
Merely Mary Ann (1931) - Mrs. Leadbatter
Are These Our Children? (1931) - Mrs. Martin - Eddie's Grandma
 Forgotten Women (1931) - Fern Madden
Lovers Courageous (1932) - Mrs. Smith
Devil's Lottery (1932) - Mrs. Mary Ann Meech
Lena Rivers (1932) - Grandmother Nichols
Young America (1932) - Grandma Beamish
Unholy Love (1932) - Mrs. Cawley
No Greater Love (1932) - Mrs. Burns
Midnight Morals (1932) - Mother O'Brien, the Prison Matron
Smilin' Through (1932) - Mrs. Crouch
Six Hours to Live (1932) - The Widow
Cavalcade (1933) - Cook
Her Splendid Folly (1933) - Mrs. McAllister
Supernatural (1933) - Madame Gourjan, Paul's Landlady
Blind Adventure (1933) - Elsie
Berkeley Square (1933) - Mrs. Barwick
Broken Dreams (1933) - Mom
Change of Heart (1934) - Harriet Hawkins
Jane Eyre (1934) - Mrs. Fairfax
The Richest Girl in the World (1934) - Marie
The Little Minister (1934) - Margaret
Age of Indiscretion (1935) - Mrs. Williams
Forbidden Heaven (1935) - Agnes, 'The Duchess'
Hitch Hike Lady (1935) - Mrs. Bayne
Magnificent Obsession (1935) - Mrs. Eden
Three Live Ghosts (1936) - Mrs. Gibbins
My Marriage (1936) - Mrs. Dolan
Call It a Day (1937) - Mrs. Elkins, the Cook
Night Must Fall (1937) - Saleslady
The Little Princess (1939) - Queen Victoria
The Hound of the Baskervilles (1939) - Mrs. Jennifer Mortimer
The Story of Alexander Graham Bell (1939) - Queen Victoria
A Woman Is the Judge (1939) - Mrs. Butler (final film role)

Notes

References

External links

 
 
 

1882 births
1939 deaths
American film actresses
American silent film actresses
British expatriates in Spain
20th-century English actresses
Burials at Forest Lawn Memorial Park (Glendale)
20th-century American actresses
British emigrants to the United States
English film actresses
English silent film actresses